Lake Trichonida ( Limni Trichonida, Ancient Greek: Τριχωνίς Trichonis) is the largest natural lake in Greece. It is situated in the eastern part of Aetolia-Acarnania, southeast of the city of Agrinio and northwest of Nafpaktos.

One million years ago the lake was much larger, and covered the central part of Aetolia-Acarnania, a part that is now a plain. The Panaitoliko mountains are situated to the north and northeast of the lake. The municipal units surrounding the lake are (from the east and clockwise) Thermo, Makryneia, Arakynthos, Thestieis, and Paravola. Around the lake, there are beautiful forests with maples, pines and other trees. The lake and its environs is home to more than 200 bird species. There are also farmland and various villages surrounding the area. The hydrocarbon lake Trichonida Lacus on the Saturnian moon Titan was named after this lake.

Gallery

Notes

References
 

Trichonida
Landforms of Western Greece
Landforms of Aetolia-Acarnania